Loh Sea Keong (born 11 February 1986) is a Malaysian professional cyclist, who currently rides for UCI Continental team . In the 2013 Jelajah Malaysia race, Loh made history by becoming the first Malaysian rider to win the competition, a Union Cycliste Internationale (UCI) race.

Career

Marco Polo Cycling Team
In 2005, Loh left Malaysia at the age of 19 to achieve his dream of becoming a full-time professional cyclist. He joined the Chinese team, based in Europe. He rode for the team until the end of 2011.

OCBC Singapore Continental Cycling Team
After failing to sign a contract with any foreign team, Loh returned to Malaysia consider his options and give himself a 2-year target to re-invigorate his career or stop altogether. Loh then accepted an offer from the first Singaporean UCI Continental team,  to ride for them.

Argos–Shimano

Major results

2008
 1st Stage 3 Tour of Thailand
2012
 2nd Overall Tour de Filipinas
 8th Overall Tour of Thailand
2013
 1st Overall Jelajah Malaysia
 1st Stage 2 Tour of Thailand
 1st Stage 4 Tour de Singkarak
 2nd Melaka Governor's Cup
 4th Road race, Southeast Asian Games
 9th Tour de Okinawa
2014
 10th Road race, Asian Road Championships
2015
 5th Overall Tour of Thailand

References

External links

Loh Sea Keong at ocbcproteam.com
Article at straitstimes.com

1986 births
Living people
People from Kelantan
Malaysian male cyclists
Malaysian people of Chinese descent
Cyclists at the 2014 Asian Games
Southeast Asian Games medalists in cycling
Southeast Asian Games silver medalists for Malaysia
Competitors at the 2013 Southeast Asian Games
Asian Games competitors for Malaysia
20th-century Malaysian people
21st-century Malaysian people